The One and Only Dick Gregory is a 2021 American documentary film, directed, written, and produced by Andre Gaines, under his Cinemation Studios banner. It follows the life and career of comedian Dick Gregory. Kevin Hart and Lena Waithe serve as executive producers under their Hartbeat Productions and Hillman Grad Productions, banners, respectively.

It had its world premiere at the Tribeca Film Festival on June 19, 2021. It was released on July 4, 2021, by Showtime.

Synopsis
The film follows the life and career of comedian and activist, Dick Gregory. Gregory, Kevin Hart, Chris Rock, Lena Waithe, Dave Chappelle, Wanda Sykes, W. Kamau Bell, Harry Belafonte, Lilian Gregory, Steve Jaffe and Christian Gregory appear in the film.

Release
The film had its world premiere at the Tribeca Film Festival on June 19, 2021. It also screened at AFI Docs on June 24, 2021. It was released on July 4, 2021, by Showtime.

Critical reception
The One and Only Dick Gregory received positive reviews from film critics. It holds a 100% approval rating on review aggregator website Rotten Tomatoes, based on 14 reviews, with a weighted average of 8.60/10. On Metacritic, the film holds a rating of 82 out of 100, based on 6 critics, indicating "universal acclaim".

References

External links

2021 documentary films
2021 films
American documentary films
Documentary films about comedy and comedians
Showtime (TV network) documentary films
2020s English-language films
2020s American films